Abdelrahman Sameh (born 9 March 2000) is an Egyptian swimmer. He competed in the men's 50 metre butterfly at the 2019 World Aquatics Championships.

References

2000 births
Living people
Egyptian male swimmers
Place of birth missing (living people)
Swimmers at the 2018 Summer Youth Olympics
Male butterfly swimmers